FC Ural-2 Yekaterinburg is a Russian football team based in Yekaterinburg. It is the farm club for FC Ural Yekaterinburg. For 2017–18 season, it received the license for the third-tier Russian Professional Football League. Ural's second team previously played on the professional level as FC Uralmash-d Yekaterinburg in the Russian Third League from 1994 to 1996.

Current squad
As of 17 February 2023, according to the official Second League website.

References

External links
  Official club page

Association football clubs established in 1994
Football clubs in Russia
Sport in Yekaterinburg
1994 establishments in Russia
FC Ural Yekaterinburg